The Headquarters Business Park Tower is a 52 story office building located on the coast site of Jeddah, Saudi Arabia.
When completed in 2012, it became the tallest building in Jeddah, overtaking the nearby King Road Tower.

The building contains offices, clinics, and restaurants. It is served by a large 11-storey parking garage and a unique heliport on the top.

Owners
Adeem Al Watania, A Saudi Arabian real estate company.

See also
 List of tallest buildings in Saudi Arabia

References

Skyscrapers in Jeddah
Office buildings completed in 2012